"Coffee and Cigarettes" is the second single from Jimmy Eat World's seventh studio album, Invented. The song was played on the radio on November 23, 2010. This is one of the five Invented tracks where singer-songwriter Courtney Marie Andrews provides guest vocals.

Reception 
Rock Sound suggests that "Coffee and Cigarettes" takes several listens to unleash its "true charm", saying "'Coffee And Cigarettes' and the title track slowly uncurl themselves over the course of a few days" and that it feels like as if Jimmy Eat World never went away. Punknews.org praises the song for its "simple yet effective chorus" and that's more memorable than most songs on the album, but criticizes the synth in the song. Eric Magnuson of Rolling Stone also cited the song's chous in its review of Invented, describing it as "big, singalong" and able to "keep a teenager engaged for a couple of days." BBC Music's Mike Haydock underlines producer Mark Trombino's work, bringing "back the sparkle to songs that could have died on their backsides" as the track's "plain melody is driven forward by bringing the bass up high in the mix."

Live performances

"Coffee and Cigarettes" was performed on Conan on December 13, 2010 with guest vocalist Ian Moore.

Personnel 
The following personnel contributed to "Coffee and Cigarettes":

Jimmy Eat World
Jim Adkins – lead vocals, guitar, recording
Rick Burch – bass guitar
Zach Lind – drums
Tom Linton – guitar

Additional musicians
 Courtney Marie Andrews – guest vocals
Production
 Jimmy Eat World – producer
 Mark Trombino – producer, mixing, additional recording
 Ted Jensen – mastering
 Morning Breath Inc. – art direction, design
 Ken Schles – photography

Charts

References

2011 singles
Jimmy Eat World songs
Songs about tobacco
Interscope Records singles
2010 songs